The Ouro Preto River is a river of Rondônia state in western Brazil, a tributary of the Pacaás Novos River.

Course

The Ouro Preto River runs from north east to south west through the Rio Ouro Preto Extractive Reserve, to the north of the Rio Ouro Preto Biological Reserve.
It joins the Pacaás Novos on the western boundary of the extractive reserve.

See also
List of rivers of Rondônia

References

Sources

Rivers of Rondônia